John Hazel (born in Cowie, Stirlingshire) is a Scottish former footballer, who played for Hibernian, Greenock Morton, East Stirlingshire and Alloa Athletic during the 1970s. Hazel played for Hibs in the 1972 Scottish Cup Final, a 6–1 defeat by Celtic.

References 

1952 births
Living people
Footballers from Falkirk (council area)
Scottish footballers
Association football midfielders
Hibernian F.C. players
Greenock Morton F.C. players
East Stirlingshire F.C. players
Alloa Athletic F.C. players
Scottish Football League players